Trichia is a genus of slime molds in the family Trichiidae. , there are 34 species in the genus.

Species

Trichia affinis
Trichia agaves
Trichia alpina
Trichia antartica
Trichia botrytis
Trichia brevicapillata
Trichia brimsiorum
Trichia brunnea
Trichia conglobata
Trichia contorta
Trichia crateriformis
Trichia crenulata
Trichia decipiens
Trichia elaterensis
Trichia erecta
Trichia favoginea
Trichia fimicola
Trichia flavicoma
Trichia heteroelaterum
Trichia huizhongii
Trichia lutescens
Trichia macbridei
Trichia microspora
Trichia mirabilis
Trichia munda
Trichia nodosa
Trichia papillata
Trichia persimilis
Trichia scabra
Trichia sordida
Trichia subfusca
Trichia subretispora
Trichia varia
Trichia verrucosa

References

Myxogastria
Amoebozoa genera